Beavertown is an unincorporated community in Washington County, in the U.S. state of Ohio.

History 
A large share of the early settlers having the last name Beaver caused the name to be selected.

References 

Unincorporated communities in Washington County, Ohio
Unincorporated communities in Ohio